Karolina Elżbieta Naja (born 5 February 1990) is a Polish sprint canoeist who has competed since the late 2000s. At the 2020 Summer Olympics, she won a bronze medal in  Women's K-4 500 metres, and silver medal in Women's K-2 500 metres.

Career
She took up canoeing in her home town of Tychy in 2001.

Naja and the Polish K-4 500 m team won the bronze medal at the 2010 ICF Canoe Sprint World Championships.

At the 2011 ICF Canoe Sprint World Championships Naja and Magdalena Krukowska won the silver medal in the K-2 200 m.  The Polish team Naja was a member of also won bronze in the K1 4 × 200m relay.

She won the bronze medal in K-2 500 m event at the 2012 Summer Olympics in London with Beata Mikołajczyk. The women's K-4 500 m team Naja was part of finished in 4th place in London. At that year's European Championships Naja and Mikołajczyk won gold in the K-2 1000 m and bronze in the K-2 500 m.

Naja and Mikołajczyk won a silver medal in the K-2 200 m event at the 2013 ICF Canoe Sprint World Championships in Duisburg, along with a bronze in the K-2 500 m.  The Polish team Naja was a member of also won silver in the K1 4 × 200m relay.  At the European Championships that year, Naja and Mikołajczyk won the K-2 500 m and K-2 1000 m.  Naja won the silver medal in the K-2 200 m with Magdalena Krukowska.

At the 2014 ICF Canoe Sprint World Championships, she won a silver medal in the women's K-4 500 m team, with Mikołajczyk, Marta Walczykiewicz and Edyta Dzieniszewska, and a bronze with Mikołajczyk in the K-2 500 m.  The Polish team Naja was a member of also won the K1 4 × 200m relay.  Naja and Mikołajczyk won silver in the K-2 500 m and were part of the Polish K-4 500 m team that won the silver medal at the 2014 European Championships.

In June 2015, she competed in the inaugural European Games, for Poland in canoe sprint, more specifically, the women's K-4 500m with Ewelina Wojnarowska, Edyta Dzieniszewska, and Beata Mikołajczyk. She earned a bronze medal. That year Naja and Mikołajczyk won the gold medal in the K-2 500 m and silver medals in the K-2 200 m in the K-2 1000 m at the European Championships.

At the 2016 Olympic Games, Naja again won bronze with Mikołajczyk in the K-2 500 m event.  This time, the K-4 500 m team Naja was part of finished in 9th.

References

External links

2010 ICF Canoe Sprint World Championships women's K-4 500 m results. – accessed 22 August 2010.

Living people
Polish female canoeists
1990 births
Canoeists at the 2012 Summer Olympics
Canoeists at the 2016 Summer Olympics
Canoeists at the 2020 Summer Olympics
Olympic canoeists of Poland
Olympic silver medalists for Poland
Olympic bronze medalists for Poland
Olympic medalists in canoeing
People from Tychy
ICF Canoe Sprint World Championships medalists in kayak
Medalists at the 2012 Summer Olympics
Medalists at the 2016 Summer Olympics
Medalists at the 2020 Summer Olympics
Sportspeople from Silesian Voivodeship
European Games medalists in canoeing
Canoeists at the 2015 European Games
European Games bronze medalists for Poland
Canoeists at the 2019 European Games
20th-century Polish women
21st-century Polish women